Jürgen Fritz (born March 12, 1953 in Köln) is a German musician. He was the keyboard player in progressive rock band Triumvirat. He also composed the film score to the 1989 science fiction film Hard to Be a God and also published a solo album in 1990, Millennium. In 1986-1988 he collaborated with German disco group Bad Boys Blue as arranger and keyboardist.

Discography

Albums 

With Triumvirat:

– Singles ;

 "Be Home for Tea" / "Broken Mirror" (1972) Harvest – 1C 006-29 976
 "Ride in the Night" / "Sing Me a Song" (1973) Harvest – 1C 006-30 407, EMI Electrola – 1C 006-30 407 U
 "Dancer's Delight" / "Timothy" (1973) Harvest – 1C 006-30 484, EMI Electrola – 1C 006-30 484
 "Dimplicity" / "Million Dollars" (1974) Harvest, EMI Electrola - 1C 006-30 576
 "Take a Break Today" / "The Capitol of Power" (1976) Harvest, EMI Electrola 1C 006-31 609
 "Waterfall" / "Jo Ann Walker" (1978) Harvest, EMI Electrola 1C 006-45 189
 "The Hymn" / "Dance on the Vulcano" (1978) Harvest – 1C 006-32 548, EMI Electrola – 1C 006-32 548
 "Waterfall" / "(Oh, I'm) Late Again" (1978) Capitol Records – SPRO-9080, Capitol Records – SPRO-9081
 "Party Life" / "Games" (1980) Harvest, EMI Electrola 1C 006-45 918

– Albums :

 1973 – Mediterranean Tales 
 1974 – Illusions on a Double Dimple
 1975 – Spartacus 
 1976 – Old Loves Die Hard 
 1977 – Pompeii 
 1978 – A la Carte
 1980 – Russian Roulette

– Best of:

 1995 – The Gold Collection – Only distributed in Germany. Included on this album is a cover from The Beach Boys' song "Darlin'"
 1995 – The Best of Triumvirat – Brazil exclusive distribution.
 ???? – The Best of the Gold Collection – Novo
 2000 – Veni, Vidi, Vici 
 2012 – Essential  EMI – 50999 6 44353 2 9

– Bootlegs:

 Illusions on a Double Dimple Live – Palace Theatre, Providence, USA October 1974
 Illusions on a Double Dimple Live – St. Bernard Cultural Center, Chalmette, LA, USA November 1974
 Live from Ultrasonic – Recorded live at Studio Ultrasonic, Hempstead, New York, October 1974
 Live Tour 1974–75 – American tour of 1974–75

– Solo: 
 1989 – Es ist nicht leicht, ein Gott zu sein (soundtrack album)
 1990 – Millennium - Dreams of Amadeus along with W. Hildenbeutel

– With Helmut Kollen:

 1977 – You Won't See Me - Keyboards & production.

- With Eric Burdon:

 1977 - Survivor - Keyboards.

- With Bad Boys Blue
 1986 - Heartbeat, keyboards, arrangement
 1987 - Love Is No Crime, keyboards, arrangement
 1988 - My Blue World, arrangement

External links 
 Official homepage
 Millenium - Dreams of Amadeus : https://www.discogs.com/Millenium-Dreams-Of-Amadeus/release/1458007

1953 births
German keyboardists
Progressive rock musicians
Living people
Musicians from Cologne